Eduard Stehlík (born 30 March 1965) is a Czech historian and writer, and Vice Director at the Institute for Military History in Prague.

He graduated from the Faculty of Philosophy at Charles University, and has worked at the Institute for Military History since 1989, focusing on Czechoslovak military history. He has also cooperated with Czech Television. He was declared an honorary citizen of Lidice on 27 October 2006.

He is a founding signatory of the Prague Declaration on European Conscience and Communism.

On 2 June 2020 Stehlík announced candidacy for the Senate as a Nominee of the Civic Democratic Party.

Works 
 Lidice - Příběh české vsi
 Lexikon tvrzí československého opevnění z let 1935-38
 Pevnosti a opevnění v Čechách, na Moravě, a ve Slezsku

References 

21st-century Czech historians
Military historians
Czech male writers
Writers from Prague
Czech anti-communists
Charles University alumni
Civic Democratic Party (Czech Republic) politicians
1965 births
Living people
Recipients of Medal of Merit (Czech Republic)
20th-century Czech historians